Peña Labra is a  high mountain located in the Sierra de Híjar range, a part of the Cantabrian Mountains System,. It is located on the boundary between the Province of Palencia and the Autonomous Community of Cantabria.

It is the westernmost peak of the  Alto Campoo Massif.

References

Cantabrian Mountains
Mountains of Cantabria
Geography of the Province of Palencia